Echium vulgare, known as viper's bugloss and blueweed, is a species of flowering plant in the borage family Boraginaceae. It is native to most of Europe and western and central Asia and it occurs as an introduced species in north-eastern North America, south-western South America and the South and North Island of New Zealand. The plant root was used in ancient times as a treatment for snake or viper bites. If eaten, the plant is toxic to horses and cattle through the accumulation of pyrrolizidine alkaloids in the liver.

Description
The pollen is blue but the filaments of the stamens remain red, contrasting against the blue flowers. It flowers between May and September in the Northern Hemisphere. The Latin specific epithet vulgare means common.

Distribution
It is native to Europe and temperate Asia. It has been introduced to Chile, New Zealand and North America, where it is naturalised in parts of the continent including northern Michigan, being listed as an invasive species in Washington. It is found in dry, calcareous grassland and heaths, bare and waste places, along railways and roadsides and on coastal cliffs, sand dunes and shingle.

Cultivation
E. vulgare is cultivated as an ornamental plant, and numerous cultivars have been developed. The cultivar 'Blue Bedder' has gained the Royal Horticultural Society’s Award of Garden Merit.

Gallery

See also
 Monofloral honey
 North American nectar sources

References

 

vulgare
Flora of Europe
Flora of Western Asia
Flora of Central Asia
Garden plants of Europe
Garden plants of Asia
Crops originating from Asia
Plants described in 1753
Taxa named by Carl Linnaeus